Equifax Canada Inc is one of two agencies (the other being TransUnion Canada) providing credit bureau and information reports for businesses, including the financial sectors. Owned by Equifax of Atlanta, Georgia, Equifax Canada is based in Toronto, Ontario.

Services offered:

 Disputes    
 Fraud   
 General   
 Score
 Fraudulent avoidance

All credit reporting company is required by law to allow Quebecers to check their credit reports and scores online at no charge, Equifax Canada took additional steps to expand this access to all Canadian.

See also
Identity theft

References

External links
 Equifax Canada

Financial services companies of Canada
Banking in Canada